Burgess Hill Town is an electoral division of West Sussex in the United Kingdom, and returns one member to sit on West Sussex County Council.

Extent
The division covers the northern part of the town of Burgess Hill, and came into existence as a result of a boundary review by the Boundary Committee for England, the results of which were accepted by the Electoral Commission in March 2009.

It comprises the following Mid Sussex District wards: Burgess Hill Dunstall, Burgess Hill Leylands and the northern part of Burgess Hill Meeds; and of the northern part of the civil parish of Burgess Hill.

Election results

2013 Election
Results of the election held on 2 May 2013:

2009 Election
Results of the election held on 4 June 2009:

References
Election Results - West Sussex County Council

External links
 West Sussex County Council
 Election Maps

Electoral Divisions of West Sussex
Burgess Hill